Lyclene angulifera is a moth of the family Erebidae. It was described by Jeremy Daniel Holloway in 2001. It is found on Sumatra and Borneo. The habitat consists of lowland heath forests and lower montane forests.

The length of the forewings is 7–8 mm for males and about 8 mm for females.

References

Nudariina
Moths described in 2001
Moths of Asia